The Kreisliga Schwaben-Nord is currently the eighth tier of the German football league system in the northern region of the Bavarian Regierungsbezirk of Swabia (German: Schwaben). Until the disbanding of the Bezirksoberliga Schwaben in 2012 it was the ninth tier. From 2008, when the 3. Liga was introduced, was the eighth tier of the league system, until the introduction of the Regionalligas in 1994 the seventh tier.

Overview
The winner of the Kreisliga Schwaben-Nord, like the winner of the Kreisliga Schwaben-Ost and the Kreisliga Schwaben-West, is directly promoted to the Bezirksliga Schwaben-Nord. The second placed teams out of those leagues and the 13th placed team out of the Bezirksliga play-off for the last spot there.

The teams relegated from the Kreisliga have to step down to the Kreisklasse. Kreisliga Schwaben-Nord is fed by the Kreisklasses Schwaben-Nord I and Schwaben-Nord II.

Until 1998, the Kreisliga Nord was called A-Klasse Nord. Until 2010, reserve teams of clubs in the league had to enter a parallel reserves division without promotion or relegation but have since been allowed to join the regular league system.

League champions
The league champions since the 1984–85 season were:

 + FC Donauwörth merged with SV Wörnitzstein-Berg at the end of the 2015–16 season, with the new club adopting the name of the latter.

Current clubs
The clubs in the league in the 2021–22 season and their 2019–21 final positions:

References

Sources
 Das Fussball Jahresjournal  Annual end-of-season magazine of the Swabian FA

External links 
 Bayerischer Fussball-Verband (Bavarian FA)  

5
2
Kreisliga